Someone in Control is the third studio album by American rock band Trapt, released on September 13, 2005 by Warner Bros. Records.

Background and release
The album was released on September 13, 2005. The album debuted at number 14 on the Billboard 200 chart, with approximatively 61,400 copies sold. Three singles were released: "Stand Up", "Waiting", and "Disconnected (Out of Touch)". Someone in Control was co-produced by Trapt and Don Gilmore. The lyrics were written by Chris Taylor Brown, music written by Trapt. As of April 2006, the album has sold 263,000 copies.

Despite the anticipation before the release, the album failed to catch the success of their debut album, possibly due to the lack of a hit single. Following the disappointing sales of the album, Trapt was dropped by Warner Bros. Records.

Critical reception

AllMusic's Johnny Loftus saw promise in the band's sophomore record elevating their 21st century SoCal proto-metal template with tracks like "Disconnected (Out of Touch)", "Waiting" and "Influence", saying they "succeed at constricting that sound, building some internal tension that gives Trapt some life outside their formula." Tom Beaujour of Blender found Chris Taylor Brown's vocals "overwrought" throughout the track listing and backhandedly complimented his bandmates' "preternatural command" of radio-ready nu-metal, concluding that "So even if Brown isn't exaggerating when he claims, "I'm always questioning my sanity," at least he won't have any trouble paying for a good shrink."

Track listing

"Alibi" released as a bonus track on Walmart.com with claim code found on the inside of the compact disc.

Personnel
Trapt

 Chris Taylor Brown – lead vocals
 Simon Ormandy – guitar
 Pete Charell – bass
 Aaron "Monty" Montgomery – drums

Production
 Produced by Don Gilmore and Trapt
 Recorded by Don Gilmore at NRG Studios, CA
 Mixed by Tom Lord-Alge at South Beach Studios, FL
 Mastered by Ted Jensen at Sterling Sound, NYC
 Keyboards and Programming: John O'Brien

Chart positions

Album

Singles

References

2005 albums
Trapt albums
Warner Records albums